Otto Michael (1859 - 1934) was a German explorer, zoologist and entomologist.
He made three expeditions to the Amazon, 1885-1888 (until 1887 accompanied by Paul Hahnel ), 1889–1893 and 
1894-1921, collecting mainly Lepidoptera for the dealership Otto Staudinger  Andreas Bang-Haas.

References
Anonym 1933 [Michael, O.]  Insektenbörse 50 147.
Lamas, G. 1979 [Michael, O.]  Bol. Colon. suiza Peru 1979(2) 36-38, 2 Fig.
Lamas, G. 1981 [Michael, O.] Rev. Per. Ent. 23 1980(1) 25-31.
Wrede, H. 1933 [Michael, O.] Ent. Z. 47 85-86.
Wrede, H. 1934 [Michael, O.] Ent. Z. 48(18) 137-138, 1 Fig.

External links
Otto Michael from Eulau by Matuszkiewicz from Sprottau, 1955.

1859 births
1934 deaths
German entomologists